Pablo Juan Campos (born 25 September 1950) is a Puerto Rican weightlifter. He competed in the men's heavyweight event at the 1972 Summer Olympics.

References

1950 births
Living people
Puerto Rican male weightlifters
Olympic weightlifters of Puerto Rico
Weightlifters at the 1972 Summer Olympics
Sportspeople from Copenhagen
20th-century Puerto Rican people